Dimorphoceratoidea is one of seventeen superfamilies included in the ammonoid suborder Goniatitina, a variety of shelled cephalopods that lived during the late Paleozoic.

References

 Miller, A.K. et al. Paleozoic Ammonoidea. Treatise on Invertebrate Paleontology. Geological Society of America and University Kansas Press. 
 Dimorphoceratoidea in GONIAT Online 5/30/12
 The Paleobiology Database  10/01/07

Goniatitida superfamilies
 
Goniatitina